The 1973 Wigan Council elections for the First Wigan Metropolitan Borough Council were held on 10 May 1973, with the entirety of the 72 seat council - three seats for each of the 24 wards - up for vote. It was the first council election as the newly formed metropolitan borough under a new constitution. The Local Government Act 1972 stipulated that the elected members were to shadow and eventually take over from the predecessor corporation on 1 April 1974. The order in which the councillors were elected dictated their term serving, with third-place candidates serving two years and up for re-election in 1975, second-placed three years expiring in 1976 and 1st-placed five years until 1978.

Labour won an overwhelming majority of sixty six seats to the Conservative's five and one Independent. Nine seats - for wards 13, 17 and 21 collectively - went unopposed and overall turnout was 34.5%.

Election result

This result had the following consequences for the total number of seats on the Council after the elections:

Ward results

References

1973 English local elections
1973
1970s in Lancashire
1970s in Greater Manchester